Desmatippus is an extinct, three-toed, browsing member of the Equidae. It lived in what is now North America during the Miocene period (about 23 mya to 5 mya). Desmatippus was 60 cm height and 20 kg in weight.

References

Miocene odd-toed ungulates
Miocene horses
Prehistoric placental genera
Miocene mammals of North America
Fossil taxa described in 1893